Parliamentary elections took place in Tunisia on 6 October 2019.

Electoral system
The 217 members of the Assembly of the Representatives of the People were elected by closed list proportional representation in 33 multi-member constituencies (27 in Tunisia and 6 representing Tunisian expatriates). Seats were allocated using the largest remainder method. Lists must adhere to the zipper system with alternating female and male candidates, and must have a male and female candidate under the age of 35 in the top four in constituencies with four or more seats.

Results

Aftermath
No party or alliance obtained enough seats for a majority. Despite losing seats, Ennahdha became the largest party due to the fracturing of votes between other smaller, newer, or less established parties. Habib Jemli, a former Minister of Agriculture (2011 to 2014), was expected to be put forward as their candidate for Prime Minister. Heart of Tunisia, the Free Destourian Party, and Tahya Tounes announced after the results were released that they would prefer to sit in opposition.

In February 2020, Parliament approved a new coalition government in a confidence vote after months of negotiations. The new coalition included Ennahdha, Tahya Tounes, the People's Movement, Democratic Current and the Tunisian Alternative, as well as several independents.

References

Tunisia
Parliamentary
Elections in Tunisia
Tunisian parliamentary election
Election and referendum articles with incomplete results